The Hoax of the Twentieth Century: The Case Against the Presumed Extermination of European Jewry is a book by Northwestern University electrical engineering professor and Holocaust denier Arthur Butz. The book was originally published in 1975 in the United Kingdom by Anthony Hancock’s Historical Review Press, known as a Holocaust denial publisher. An antisemitic work, it has been influential in the Holocaust denial movement. Canadian academic Alan T. Davies has described it as an "antisemitic classic".

Butz argues that Nazi Germany did not exterminate millions of Jews using homicidal gas chambers during World War II but that the Holocaust was a propaganda hoax.

The book has been banned in Canada and is X-rated in Germany where it cannot be displayed or advertised. In 2017, the online book seller Amazon.com removed the book, along with other Holocaust-denying titles, from its US and UK sites.

Notes

External links
 The Hoax of the Twentieth Century at archive.org

1975 non-fiction books
Antisemitic publications
Censored books
Censorship in Canada
Censorship in Germany
English-language books
Holocaust-denying books